Homona difficilis is a species of moth of the family Tortricidae. It is found in Vietnam and on Borneo.

References

Moths described in 1928
Homona (moth)